Iron comb may refer to:

An iron comb used for combing wool
A similar or identical instrument used for combing, a form of torture
A hot comb used for straightening human hair